The 2011–12 Handball-Bundesliga is the 47th season of the Handball-Bundesliga, Germany's premier handball league, and the 35th season consisting of only one league.

Team information

League table

Updated to games played on 2 June 2012
Source:
The number on the left of the colon is points gained, the number to the left is points conceded

External links 
 Kicker magazine 
 scoresway.com 
 Handball-bundesliga website 

2011-12
2011 in German sport
2012 in German sport
2011–12 domestic handball leagues